Lothagam is a geological formation located in Kenya, near the southwestern shores of Lake Turkana,  from Kanapoi. It is located between the Kerio and Lomunyenkuparet Rivers on an uplifted fault block. Lothagam has deposits dating to the Miocene-Pliocene period and numerous palaeontological finds have been recovered here. Archaeological sites dating to the Holocene are also found at Lothagam, including the Lothagam Lokam harpoon site and the Lothagam North Pillar Site.

Background
Bryan Patterson from Harvard University was, in 1967, the first to carry out paleontological research at Lothagam. Meave Leakey has also carried out extensive paleontological research at Lothagam.

See also 
 List of fossil sites

References

Pliocene paleontological sites of Africa
Miocene paleontological sites of Africa
Paleontology in Kenya